Gary Howard Klar (March 24, 1947 – December 31, 2020) was an American actor known for his role as Pvt. Steel in George A. Romero's cult classic zombie film Day of the Dead. He also appeared in Married to the Mob (1988), Big (1988), and Hackers (1995).

Biography
Klar was born on March 24, 1947 in Bridgeport, Connecticut, and was raised by adoptive parents. He had 12 siblings all of whom were adopted too. He was not aware of his adoption until many years later. He played football in college and briefly played professionally but his career unfortunately ended after an injury. He later set out to become an actor. His first film was in 1980's Hero at Large in a small role as a camera man. His biggest role was that of Pvt. Steel in the 1985 zombie horror film Day of the Dead. He continued to play minor roles in films such as Three Men and a Baby and Big. On December 30, 1998, he received an unannounced phone call from a Connecticut state official informing him of his adoption for the first time. He was also told that his friend Steve, who he had known since they were young, was his biological brother and a woman he dated in youth was his biological sister. His story was showcased on many television shows including Dateline NBC and Good Morning America.
Klar's last public appearance was on April 11, 2015 when he appeared at the Cinema Wasteland convention in Strongsville, Ohio with fellow Day of the Dead cast and crew members Lori Cardille, Joe Pilato, John Amplas, Anthony Dileo Jr., Jarlath Conroy, Terry Alexander, Sherman Howard, Tom Savini, Phil Kellams and Taso Stavrakis at a panel to commemorate the 30th anniversary of the film's release.

Personal life
Klar resided in Connecticut with his wife and children. 

It was confirmed on January 1, 2021, by the George A. Romero Foundation that Klar had died on December 31, 2020.

Filmography

References

External links
 

1947 births
2020 deaths
Male actors from Bridgeport, Connecticut
American male film actors